Severny Vestnik was an influential Russian literary magazine founded in Saint Petersburg in 1885  by Anna Yevreinova, who stayed with it until 1889.

History
In the early years Severny Vestnik was the Narodnik's stable; after Otechestvennye Zapiski folded in 1884 it was here that Nikolay Mikhaylovsky and his allies took refuge, among them being Gleb Uspensky, Vladimir Korolenko and Anton Chekhov.

Later, in the 1890s, after Liubov Gurevich's group had acquired it, Severny Vestnik became the center of the Russian decadent movement with Dmitry Merezhkovsky, Zinaida Gippius, Konstantin Balmont and Fyodor Sologub as stalwarts. Mikhail Albov edited the magazine in the 1890s.

References

1885 establishments in the Russian Empire
1898 disestablishments in the Russian Empire
Defunct literary magazines published in Europe
Defunct magazines published in Russia
Magazines established in 1885
Magazines disestablished in 1898
Magazines published in Saint Petersburg
Russian-language magazines
Literary magazines published in Russia
Monthly magazines published in Russia
Russian symbolism